"Jesu, Joy of Man's Desiring" (or simply "Joy"; German: Jesus bleibet meine Freude) is the most common English title of a piece of music derived from a chorale setting from the cantata Herz und Mund und Tat und Leben, BWV 147 ("Heart and Mouth and Deed and Life"), composed by Johann Sebastian Bach in 1723. The same music on different stanzas of a chorale closes both parts of the cantata.

A transcription by the English pianist Myra Hess (1890–1965) was published in 1926 for piano solo and in 1934 for piano duet. It is often performed slowly and reverently at wedding ceremonies, as well as during Christian festive seasons like Christmas and Easter.

Background
Bach composed a four-part setting with independent orchestral accompaniment of two stanzas of the hymn "", written by Martin Janus in 1661, which was sung to a melody by the violinist and composer Johann Schop, "". The movements conclude the two parts of the cantata.

Bach scored the chorale movements (6 and 10) from Herz und Mund und Tat und Leben for choir, trumpet, violin, optionally oboe, viola, and basso continuo.

Instrumental arrangements

The music's wide popularity has led to numerous arrangements and transcriptions, such as for the classical guitar and, in Wendy Carlos' album Switched-On Bach, on the Moog synthesizer. According to The New Oxford Companion to Music, the best-known transcription for piano is by Dame Myra Hess.

Text

English text
The following is a version with words attributed to the poet laureate Robert Bridges. It is not a translation of the stanzas used within Bach's original version, but is inspired by stanzas of the same hymn that Bach had drawn upon: "Jesu, meiner Seelen Wonne", the lyrics of which were written in 1661 by Martin Janus (or Jahn), and which was sung to Johann Schop's 1642 "Werde munter, mein Gemüte" hymn tune.

Jesu, joy of man's desiring,
Holy wisdom, love most bright;
Drawn by Thee, our souls aspiring
Soar to uncreated light.

Word of God, our flesh that fashioned,
With the fire of life impassioned,
Striving still to truth unknown,
Soaring, dying round Thy throne.

Through the way where hope is guiding,
Hark, what peaceful music rings;
Where the flock, in Thee confiding,
Drink of joy from deathless springs.

Theirs is beauty's fairest pleasure;
Theirs is wisdom's holiest treasure.
Thou dost ever lead Thine own
In the love of joys unknown.

Original text

Jahn's verses express a close, friendly, and familiar friendship with Jesus, who gives life to the poet. It has been noted that the original German hymn was characteristically a lively hymn of praise, which is carried over somewhat into Bach's arrangement; whereas a slower, more stately tempo is traditionally used with the English version.
Wohl mir, daß ich Jesum habe,
o wie feste halt' ich ihn,
daß er mir mein Herze labe,
wenn ich krank und traurig bin.
Jesum hab' ich, der mich liebet
und sich mir zu eigen giebet,
ach drum laß' ich Jesum nicht,
wenn mir gleich mein Herze bricht.
 

Jesus bleibet meine Freude,
meines Herzens Trost und Saft,
Jesus wehret allem Leide,
er ist meines Lebens Kraft,
meiner Augen Lust und Sonne,
meiner Seele Schatz und Wonne;
darum laß' ich Jesum nicht
aus dem Herzen und Gesicht.
 
Well for me that I have Jesus,
O how tightly I hold him
that he might refresh my heart,
when I'm sick and sad.
Jesus I have, who loves me
and gives himself to me,
ah, therefore I will not leave Jesus,
Even if I feel my heart is breaking.
—from BWV 147, chorale movement no. 6

Jesus remains my joy,
my heart's comfort and essence,
Jesus fends off all suffering,
He is my life's strength,
my eye's desire and sun,
my soul's treasure and pleasure;
Therefore I will not leave Jesus
out of heart and face.
—from BWV 147, chorale movement no. 10

Modern adaptations
The melody and other elements have been used in several pop and classical crossover recordings:
 "Someone I Know", on Margo Guryan's 1968 album Take a Picture
 Included as the coda of "Cherry Blossom Clinic Revisited", on The Move's 1970 album Shazam
 "Wicked Annabella", a 1968 track on The Kinks Are the Village Green Preservation Society, with Bach in Pete Quaife's bassline
 "Joy", a 1972 instrumental by Apollo 100, which reached number six on the U.S. Billboard Hot 100 and number 24 in the RPM Canadian chart 
 "Joy", an instrumental track on George Winston's 1982 album December, inspired by an arrangement by guitarist David Qualey
 "Dormi dormi", a 2019 track on the extended album Sì by Andrea Bocelli, a lullaby inspired by the chorale, sung by Bocelli and Jennifer Garner in Italian and English
 "Lady Lynda", a 1979 single by The Beach Boys which reached the Top 10 of the UK Singles Chart

References

External links

 
 
 German original version and English translation, Choir of Somerville College, Oxford, YouTube

Arrangements of compositions by Johann Sebastian Bach